Nikolay Novikov (born 15 May 1946) is a Russian boxer. He competed in the men's flyweight event at the 1968 Summer Olympics.

References

1946 births
Living people
Russian male boxers
Olympic boxers of the Soviet Union
Boxers at the 1968 Summer Olympics
Sportspeople from Tula, Russia
Flyweight boxers